Copecrypta is a genus of flies in the family Tachinidae.

Species
C. ruficauda van der Wulp, 1867

References

Tachininae
Tachinidae genera
Taxa named by Francis Walker (entomologist)